The Winkler test is used to determine the concentration of dissolved oxygen in water samples. Dissolved oxygen (D.O.) is widely used in water quality studies and routine operation of water reclamation facilities to analyze its level of oxygen saturation.

In the test, an excess of manganese(II) salt, iodide (I−) and hydroxide (OH−) ions are added to a water sample causing a white precipitate of Mn(OH)2 to form.  This precipitate is then oxidized by the oxygen that is present in the water sample into a brown manganese-containing precipitate with manganese in a more highly oxidized state (either Mn(III) or Mn(IV)).

In the next step, a strong acid (either hydrochloric acid or sulfuric acid) is added to acidify the solution.  The brown precipitate then converts the iodide ion (I−) to iodine.  The amount of dissolved oxygen is directly proportional to the titration of iodine with a thiosulfate solution.  Today, the method is effectively used as its colorimetric modification, where the trivalent manganese produced on acidifying the brown suspension is directly reacted with ethylenediaminetetraacetic acid to give a pink color. As manganese is the only common metal giving a color reaction with ethylenediaminetetraacetic acid, it has the added effect of masking other metals as colorless complexes.

History
The test was originally developed by Ludwig Wilhelm Winkler, in later literature referred to as Lajos Winkler, while working at Budapest University on his doctoral dissertation in 1888. The amount of dissolved oxygen is a measure of the biological activity of the water masses. Phytoplankton and macroalgae present in the water mass-produce oxygen by way of photosynthesis.  Bacteria and eukaryotic organisms (zooplankton, fish) consume this oxygen through cellular respiration. The result of these two mechanisms determines the concentration of dissolved oxygen, which in turn indicates the production of biomass. The difference between the physical concentration of oxygen in the water (or the theoretical concentration if there were no living organisms) and the actual concentration of oxygen is called the biochemical demand in oxygen. The Winkler test is often controversial as it is not 100% accurate and the oxygen levels may fluctuate from test to test despite using the same constant sample.

Chemical processes

In the first step, manganese(II) sulphate (at 48% of the total volume) is added to an environmental water sample.  Next, potassium iodide (15% in potassium hydroxide 70%) is added to create a pinkish-brown precipitate.  In the alkaline solution, dissolved oxygen will oxidize manganese(II) ions to the tetravalent state.

 2 Mn2+ + O2 + 2 H2O  → 2 MnO(OH)2

Mn has been oxidised to 4+, and MnO(OH)2 appears as a brown precipitate.  There is some uncertainty about whether the oxidised manganese is tetravalent or trivalent. Some sources claim that Mn(OH)3 is the brown precipitate, but hydrated MnO2 may also give the brown colour.

 4 Mn(OH)2 + O2 + 2 H2O → 4 Mn(OH)3

The second part of the Winkler test reduces (acidifies) the solution.  The precipitate will dissolve back into solution as the H+ reacts with the O2− and OH− to form water.

 MnO(OH)2 + 4 H+ → Mn4+ + 3 H2O

The acid facilitates the conversion by the brown, Manganese-containing precipitate of the Iodide ion into elemental Iodine.

The Mn(SO4)2 formed by the acid converts the iodide ions into iodine, itself being reduced back to manganese(II) ions in an acidic medium.

 Mn(SO4)2 + 2 I− →  Mn2+ + I2 + 2 

Thiosulfate is used, with a starch indicator, to titrate the iodine.

 2  + I2 →  + 2 I−

Analysis

From the above stoichiometric equations, we can find that:

1 mole of O2 → 2 moles of MnO(OH)2 → 2 mole of I2 → 4 mole of 

Therefore, after determining the number of moles of iodine produced, we can work out the number of moles of oxygen molecules present in the original water sample. The oxygen content is usually presented in milligrams per liter (mg/L).

Limitations

The success of this method is critically dependent upon the manner in which the sample is manipulated. At all stages, steps must be taken to ensure that oxygen is neither introduced to nor lost from the sample. Furthermore, the water sample must be free of any solutes that will oxidize or reduce iodine.

Instrumental methods for measurement of dissolved oxygen have widely supplanted the routine use of the Winkler test, although the test is still used to check instrument calibration.

BOD5

To determine five-day biochemical oxygen demand (BOD5), several dilutions of a sample are analyzed for dissolved oxygen before and after a five-day incubation period at 20 °C in the dark. In some cases, bacteria are used to provide a standardized community to uptake oxygen while consuming the organic matter in the sample; these bacteria are known as "seed". The difference in DO and the dilution factor are used to calculated BOD5. The resulting number (usually reported in parts per million or milligrams per liter) is useful in determining the relative organic strength of sewage or other polluted waters.

The BOD5 test is an example of analysis that determines classes of materials in a sample.

Winkler bottle

A Winkler bottle is a piece of laboratory glassware specifically made for carrying out the Winkler test.  These bottles have conical tops and a close fitting stopper to aid in the exclusion of air bubbles when the top is sealed.  This is important because oxygen in trapped air would be included in the measurement and would affect the accuracy of the test.

References

Further reading

 Moran, Joseph M.; Morgan, Michael D., & Wiersma, James H. (1980).  Introduction to Environmental Science (2nd ed.). W.H. Freeman and Company, New York, NY 
 
 
 Y.C. Wong & C.T. Wong. New Way Chemistry for Hong Kong A-Level Volume 4, p. 248. 
 Manganese (III) consistently claimed  (NB: Gives unbalanced equation for formation of MnO(OH)2). Claims manganese (III) gives manganese (IV) consistently.   

Aquatic ecology
Water quality indicators
Oxygen